Billie Jean King defeated Evonne Goolagong Cawley in the final, 6–0, 6–1 to win the ladies' singles tennis title at the 1975 Wimbledon Championships.

Chris Evert was the defending champion, but lost in the semifinals to King.

Seeds

  Chris Evert (semifinals)
  Martina Navrátilová (quarterfinals)
  Billie Jean King (champion)
  Evonne Goolagong Cawley (final)
  Margaret Court (semifinals)
  Virginia Wade (quarterfinals)
  Olga Morozova (quarterfinals)
  Kerry Reid (second round)

Qualifying

Draw

Finals

Top half

Section 1

Section 2

Section 3

Section 4

Bottom half

Section 5

Section 6

Section 7

Section 8

References

External links

1975 Wimbledon Championships – Women's draws and results at the International Tennis Federation

Women's Singles
Wimbledon Championship by year – Women's singles
Wimbledon Championships
Wimbledon Championships